Jujubinus baudoni is a species of sea snail, a marine gastropod mollusk in the family Trochidae, the top snails.

Description
The size of the shell varies between 3.5 mm and 8 mm.

Distribution
This species occurs in the Mediterranean Sea and in the Atlantic Ocean off Spain and Portugal.

References

 Monterosato T. A. (di), 1891: Molluschi fossili quaternari di S. Flavia; Naturalista Siciliano, Palermo 10 (5): 96–104 [febbraio] 10 (6): 120–125 [marzo]
 Ghisotti F. & Melone G., 1969–1975: Catalogo illustrato delle conchiglie marine del Mediterraneo; Conchiglie Part 1: suppl. 5 (11–12): 1–28 [1969]. Part 2: suppl. 6 (3–4): 29–46 [1970]. Part 3: suppl. 7 (1–2): 47–77 [1971]. Part 4. suppl. 8 (11–12): 79–144 [1972]. Part 5. suppl. 11 (11–12): 147–208 [1975]
 Gofas, S.; Le Renard, J.; Bouchet, P. (2001). Mollusca, in: Costello, M.J. et al. (Ed.) (2001). European register of marine species: a check-list of the marine species in Europe and a bibliography of guides to their identification. Collection Patrimoines Naturels, 50: pp. 180–213

External links
 

baudoni
Gastropods described in 1891